PackageKit is a free and open-source suite of software applications designed to provide a consistent and high-level front end for a number of different package management systems. PackageKit was created by Richard Hughes in 2007, and first introduced into an operating system as a default application in May 2008 with the release of Fedora 9.

The suite is cross-platform, though it is primarily targeted at Linux distributions which follow the interoperability standards set out by the freedesktop.org group. It uses the software libraries provided by the D-Bus and Polkit projects to handle inter-process communication and privilege negotiation respectively.

PackageKit seeks to introduce automatic updates without having to authenticate as root, fast-user-switching, warnings translated into the correct locale, common upstream GNOME and KDE tools and one software over multiple Linux distributions.

Although bug fixes are still released, no major features have been developed since around 2014, and the package's maintainer predicts that it will gradually be replaced by other tools as technologies such as Flatpak and Snap become more popular.

Software architecture
PackageKit runs as a system-activated daemon, named packagekitd, which abstracts out differences between the different systems. A library called libpackagekit allows other programs to interact with PackageKit.

Features include:
 installing local files, ServicePack media and packages from remote sources
 authorization using Polkit
 the use of existing packaging tools
 multi-user system awareness – it will not allow shutdown in critical parts of the transaction
 a system-activated daemon which exits when not in use

Front-ends

 pkcon is the official front-end of PackageKit, it operates from the command-line.
GTK-based:
 gnome-packagekit is an official GNOME front-end for PackageKit. Unlike GNOME Software, gnome-packagekit can handle all packages, not just applications, and has advanced features that are missing in GNOME Software as of June 2020.
 GNOME Software is a utility for installing the applications and updates on Linux. It is part of the GNOME Core Applications and was introduced in GNOME 3.10.

Qt-based:

Back-ends
A number of different package management systems (known as back-ends) support different abstract methods and signals used by the front-end tools. Supported back-ends include:
 Advanced Packaging Tool (APT)
 Conary
 libdnf & librepo, the libraries upon which DNF, (the successor to yum) builds
 Entropy
 Opkg
 pacman
 PiSi
 Portage
 Smart Package Manager
 urpmi
 YUM
 ZYpp

See also

 AppStream
 Listaller
 Polkit
 Red Carpet
 Software Updater
 List of Linux package management systems

References

External links

 

Applications using D-Bus
Free package management systems
Free software programmed in C
Free software programmed in C++
Free software programmed in Python
Linux package management-related software
Linux PMS graphical front-ends
Package management software that uses GTK
Package management software that uses Qt